Lincoln Beach can refer to:

  Lincoln Beach, Oregon
  Lincoln Beach amusement park, a former amusement park in New Orleans, Louisiana